DeLong (also called De Long or Delong) is an unincorporated community in Orange Township, Knox County, Illinois, United States.

History
DeLong was laid out in 1882, and named in memory of George W. DeLong (1844–1881), a United States Navy officer and explorer. A post office opened at DeLong in 1883, and remained in operation until 1969.

References

Unincorporated communities in Knox County, Illinois
Unincorporated communities in Illinois